Alchemilla micans is a species of flowering plant belonging to the family Rosaceae.

Its native range is Europe.

References

micans